Prambachkirchen is a town in the district of Eferding in the Austrian state of Upper Austria.

Population

References

Cities and towns in Eferding District